In the aftermath of the August 2020 police shooting of Jacob Blake, protests, riots, and civil unrest occurred in Kenosha, Wisconsin, and around the United States as part of the larger 2020–2022 United States racial unrest and Black Lives Matter movements. In addition to street protests, marches, and demonstrations, the shooting also led to the 2020 American athlete boycotts.

The demonstrations were marked by daily peaceful protesting followed by confrontations with law enforcement and rioting and arson at night. A state of emergency was declared on August 23, and the National Guard was activated the following day. Further confrontations arose when armed militia members, whom Kenosha County Sheriff David Beth described as "like a group of vigilantes", arrived with the expressed intent of protecting businesses in the city.

Two protesters were fatally shot and a third was injured on August 25, 2020, by Kyle Rittenhouse, a 17-year-old from Antioch, Illinois.  At a jury trial in November 2021, he argued that he had acted in self-defense and was found not guilty of murder and other charges.

Background

Jacob Blake is an African-American man who was shot seven times during an arrest by police officer Rusten Sheskey. The incident occurred in Kenosha on August 23, 2020, as police officers were attempting to arrest Blake. Blake was unsuccessfully tasered. He was shot after he opened the door to an SUV he had been using and reached into the vehicle. In an interview, Blake said that during the scuffle he picked up a "pocket knife" which had fallen from his pants and he was trying to put it in his vehicle when he was shot.  The officer said he fired when he believed Blake would use the knife to stab him. Blake survived, but was paralyzed from the waist down. He was initially handcuffed to the hospital bed and deputies were posted in his room, but the handcuffs and deputies were later removed and a warrant for his arrest was vacated after Blake paid a bond.

Events in Kenosha

Protests and riots

Day 1: August 23
A state of emergency was declared in the county starting at 10:15 p.m., and garbage trucks were used to block 56th Street. Starting at 11:05 p.m., police began using tear gas and rubber bullets in an attempt to disperse crowds, which lasted throughout the night. Near midnight, the crowd lit a small fire in front of a ground-floor window of the Kenosha County Courthouse and at least three garbage trucks and a trolley car were lit on fire.

By 2:30 a.m., a truck in a used car dealership along Sheridan Road was lit on fire. The fire spread to most of the 100 other cars on the lot, damaging an entrance sign for the nearby Bradford Community Church (it did not spread to the church building itself). The buildings surrounding Civic Center Park, along with many downtown businesses, including the post office, Reuther High School, the Kenosha County Administration Building, and the Dinosaur Discovery Museum all sustained damage to their front windows and entrance foyers.

Police scanners stated that a Lenco BearCat armored personnel carrier was damaged by protesters, and a video posted by a local newspaper appeared to show an officer being knocked out with a brick.

Day 2: August 24
Mostly peaceful demonstrations were held during the day.

Wisconsin Governor Tony Evers activated the Wisconsin National Guard to protect firefighters and critical infrastructure in Kenosha. The ACLU of Wisconsin strongly opposed the move.
The county announced a curfew that went into effect 8:00 p.m. on August 24. Metra suspended commuter rail service north of Waukegan station. The Kenosha County exits for Interstate 41/94 were closed.

Protesters broke a door off its hinges in an effort to forcefully enter the Public Safety Building before being turned back by pepper spray. Teargas was deployed for a second night starting around 8:30 p.m. in an attempt to disperse unlawful crowds gathered near the courthouse, as protesters launched fireworks at police. Another garbage truck was lit on fire, while armed gunmen appeared to be guarding a downtown gas station.

Arsonists targeted a Wisconsin Department of Corrections community probation and parole office and the city's Danish Brotherhood Lodge. Other buildings set on fire included a furniture store, residential apartments and several homes. Firefighters worked into the morning of August 25.

The Kenosha Guard, a citizen militia organization with a Facebook group, created an event page named "Armed Citizens to Protect our Lives and Property" on August 24, and by the next evening the page had over 5,000 users. The Kenosha Guard hosted a gathering for militia members to choose locations in the city to protect. Sheriff Beth stated that the presence of militia members created confusion and complicated the situation. Facebook removed the group and page on August 26.

Day 3: August 25
The Kenosha County Board sent a letter to Governor Evers requesting the deployment of an additional 2,000 national guardsmen. Kenosha County Sheriff David Beth asserted that most of the damage was from individuals with no intent to protest and who were not from Kenosha County. Governor Evers declared a state of emergency for the region, sending in 250 troops from the Wisconsin National Guard to the city.

Law enforcement erected a tall fence to protect the courthouse. Protesters attempted to breach the fence line throughout the night but failed. The Kenosha fire chief said there were 34 active fires and 30 businesses damaged or destroyed and the police said there were arrests associated with looting.

Significant numbers of armed civilians were also on the streets. Police said that such groups had not been invited and were not helpful. Kenosha County Sheriff David Beth described them as "a militia... like a vigilante group." However, cellphone footage showed police thanking armed civilians and giving them bottles of water. Sheriff Beth characterized the officers as "very wrong to say that" to the militia members.

At around 11:45 pm, 17-year-old Illinois resident Kyle Rittenhouse shot and killed two people and injured a third.

Day 4: August 26
Protests continued peacefully with chants and sidewalk art in a park near the courthouse, followed by a march. Riot police and National Guard troops did not have a visible presence.

The Kenosha County Board sent a second letter to Governor Evers requesting the deployment of an additional 1,500 national guardsmen. "Our county is under attack," the board wrote in the letter. "Our businesses are under attack. Our homes are under attack. Our local law enforcement agencies need additional support to help bring civility back to our community."

Later developments

By August 28, 2020, the state had deployed nearly 1,000 National Guard troops and more than 200 federal agents. The Michigan National Guard, Arizona National Guard, and Alabama National Guard all sent troops to assist.

Protests continued daily through August 29, when about 1,000 people participated in a march and rally. Speakers included the father of Jacob Blake, Lieutenant Governor Mandela Barnes and others who called for police reform legislation. The group marched to the Kenosha Courthouse chanting, "7 bullets, 7 days", "One Person, One Vote" and "No Justice, No Peace".

Two men from Missouri who had traveled to Kenosha, who described themselves as militia members, were arrested on federal gun charges on September 1. Prosecutors alleged that one of them had told a witness that he was going to Kenosha "with the intention of possibly using the firearms on people". Kenosha County's state of emergency curfew ended as of September 2.

In March 2021, the Kenosha Police Department reported that in addition to at least 250 protest-related arrests in 2020, an additional 55 (49 adults and 6 minors) had been charged with connected crimes. Of these, 35 were Kenosha residents. Additional arrests were expected in following months.

Visits by political figures
President Donald Trump visited Kenosha on September 1, 2020, to see the damage caused by the protests and to praise law enforcement. He participated in a roundtable, but did not meet with Blake or his family. In a letter to Trump, Governor Evers had asked him to reconsider his visit over concerns that his presence would hinder efforts to "overcome division". Kenosha Mayor John Antaramian and the city's NAACP branch president had expressed similar reservations, with Antaramian saying the trip was "ill advised" and the NAACP branch president stating it would "only inflame tensions". However, Trump insisted he was going to make the trip. Former governor Scott Walker, U.S. Senator Ron Johnson, and seven Kenosha County board members had encouraged the visit. During his visit, he met with store owners whose property was damaged during the protests with at least one owner refusing to be a part of the event. Trump engaged in a round table discussion on community safety at Mary D. Bradford High School with protesters and supporters lining the streets during his visit.

Democratic presidential candidate Joe Biden visited Kenosha on September 3. The Biden campaign said he had received "overwhelming requests" from local officials for the Kenosha visit, although it was against the suggestion of the local NAACP president and also Kenosha County Executive Jim Kreuser. During this first campaign visit to Wisconsin, Biden met with Jacob Blake's family and held a community meeting.

Damage assessments

City property valued at $2 million was destroyed by rioters, including  garbage trucks, street lights and traffic signals. Kenosha's mayor requested $30 million in aid from the state to cover the extensive damage. Damage to private property could be as high as $50 million, according to estimates from the Kenosha Area Business Alliance. This includes the 100-year-old Danish Brotherhood Lodge which was burned down when 40 buildings were destroyed and an additional 100 buildings damaged.

On October 2, 2020, the Bureau of Alcohol, Tobacco, Firearms and Explosives released photos and videos of suspected arsonists, offering up to $5,000 reward for each person identified.

Fatal shooting 

On August 25, Kyle Rittenhouse, a 17-year-old from nearby Antioch, Illinois, shot three people with an AR-15 style rifle. Kenosha resident Joseph Rosenbaum, 36, and nearby Silver Lake resident Anthony Huber, 26, were killed; while Gaige Grosskreutz, 26, a resident of nearby West Allis, Wisconsin, was injured.

Various people in the vicinity chased Rittenhouse as he ran away after shooting Rosenbaum. Rittenhouse fell down and shot two men, Huber and Grosskreutz, as they confronted him, one armed with a handgun. He then walked away with his hands up at times to the police. He was not arrested by the local police at that moment, but turned himself in to police in his hometown of Antioch, Illinois the next morning.

At trial, Rittenhouse was acquitted of all charges.

Events elsewhere

Athlete strikes

In protest of Blake's shooting, multiple professional athletes refused to play their respective sports contests that week. It started on August 26 when the Milwaukee Bucks of the National Basketball Association (NBA) refused to take the court for a playoff game. Members of other teams in the NBA, Women's National Basketball Association (WNBA), Major League Baseball (MLB), and Major League Soccer (MLS) all decided not to play their games on August 26, 2020. The strikes extended into August 27 and 28 when players from the National Hockey League (NHL) refused to play their playoff games. In response to these events, nine National Football League (NFL) teams cancelled their scheduled practices on August 27, 2020.

Other locales
During the Kenosha unrest, there were similar protests and riots in Madison, Wisconsin, Atlanta, Georgia, Minneapolis, Minnesota, New York City, and Philadelphia. In California protests emerged in Los Angeles, Oakland, Sacramento, San Diego, and San Jose. Blake's aunt, Nicole Blake Chafetz of Seattle, encouraged peaceful protests while discouraging the violence and property damage that had occurred during the protests in Seattle. The events in Atlanta, Oakland, and San Diego included violence against police officers, and vandalism and property destruction occurred in Atlanta, Madison, Minneapolis, Oakland, Sacramento, and San Jose, for which related arrests were made.

District Attorney's decision
On January 4, 2021, the Kenosha County Sheriff declared a state of emergency and National Guard troops were deployed to Kenosha ahead of the expected announcement regarding whether or not criminal charges would be filed against Officer Sheskey. On January 5, Kenosha County District Attorney Michael Graveley officially announced that no criminal charges would be filed against Officer Sheskey, any other officers, or against Jacob Blake. A rally for Blake was held on January 4. No violence was reported in the city and Blake's family held a peaceful march on January 11 calling for the officer to be fired. That afternoon, the National Guard was pulled out of Kenosha and deployed to Madison due to the onset of the 2021 United States inauguration week protests.

See also

 Killing of Alvin Cole
 Ferguson unrest
 George Floyd protests
 George Floyd protests in Wisconsin
 2020–2022 United States racial unrest
 List of incidents of civil unrest in the United States

References

External links
 

2020 controversies in the United States
2020 fires in the United States
2020 in Wisconsin
2020 protests
2020 riots
2020–2021 United States racial unrest
African-American history of Wisconsin
African-American-related controversies
Arson in the 2020s
Arson in the United States
August 2020 events in the United States
Black Lives Matter
Protests
Law enforcement controversies in the United States
Law enforcement in Wisconsin
Post–civil rights era in African-American history
Protests in Wisconsin
September 2020 events in the United States
Shooting of Jacob Blake